The 2006 FIA GT3 European Championship season was the inaugural season of the FIA GT3 European Championship.  The season began on May 2, 2006, and ended on September 17, 2006, and featured ten one-hour races over five rounds.

Schedule
All races were one hour in length, and served as support races for the FIA GT Championship.

Season results

Championships

Teams Championship

Drivers Championship
Points are awarded to the top eight finishers in the order 10-8-6-5-4-3-2-1

References

Gt3
Fia gt3
FIA GT3 European Championship